1993 Urawa Red Diamonds season

Review and events

League results summary

League results by round

Competitions

Domestic results

J.League

Suntory series

NICOS series

Emperor's Cup

J.League Cup

Player statistics

 † player(s) joined the team after the opening of this season.

Transfers

In:

Out:

Transfers during the season

In
Uwe Rahn (from Eintracht Frankfurt on August)
Michael Rummenigge (from Borussia Dortmund on September)
Miro (from Dunajská Streda on September)
Kōichi Nakazato (loan return from Danubio on December)

Out
Kōichi Nakazato (lone to Danubio on March)
Victor Ferreyra (released on June)
Marcelo Morales (released on July)

References

Other pages
 J. League official site
 Urawa Red Diamonds official site

Urawa Red Diamonds
Urawa Red Diamonds seasons